Steve Shamal (born 22 February 1996) is a French professional footballer who plays for Annecy, as a winger.

Professional career
On 10 August 2017, Shamal joined Stade de Reims after a couple of years in the reserve sides of Bordeaux and Auxerre. Shamal made his first team debut for Reims in a 3–1 Ligue 2 win over RC Lens on 17 March 2018. He signed his first professional contract, of three-years duration, with the club in April 2018. He helped Reims win the 2017–18 Ligue 2 and gain promotion to Ligue 1 for the 2018-19 season.

In June 2018 Shamal joined Quevilly-Rouen on a season-long loan.

In August 2019 Shamal joined Boulogne on a two-year deal. Having been tracked by Caen throughout the 2019–20 season, he was signed by the club in October 2020, although due to a cruciate ligament injury he was not expected to play until 2021.

On 17 June 2022, Shamal agreed to move to Annecy.

International career
Shamal was born in France to a Palestinian father and Algerian mother. He is a youth international for France, having played for the France U16s.

Honours
Reims
 Ligue 2 (1): 2017-18

References

External links
 
 
 
 
 

Living people
1996 births
People from Ivry-sur-Seine
Association football wingers
French footballers
France youth international footballers
French people of Palestinian descent
French sportspeople of Algerian descent
Stade de Reims players
US Quevilly-Rouen Métropole players
US Boulogne players
Stade Malherbe Caen players
FC Annecy players
Ligue 2 players
Championnat National players
Championnat National 2 players
Footballers from Val-de-Marne